Torre (English: Tower) is the highest point of mainland Portugal, and the second-highest in the country overall (only Mount Pico, in the Azores, is higher). This point is not a distinctive mountain summit, but rather the highest point in a plateau. Torre has an unusual feature of being a summit that is accessible by paved road, the Regional Road 339 (R 339), formerly National Road 339 (N 339).

It is located in a mountain range named Serra da Estrela, on the border between the municipalities of Seia, District of Guarda and Covilhã, District of Castelo Branco.

The actual elevation of this area is 1,993 metres (6,537 feet), according to measures realized by the Instituto Geográfico do Exército (a military organization). Right in the highest point of the mountain range, situated in the middle of a roundabout, near a road that connects the cities of Seia and Covilhã, a trig point that shows the highest point in Serra da Estrela was built.

Near Torre, there are a restaurant, stores with typical products of this region, like the Serra da Estrela cheese, and a ski center called Vodafone Ski Resort, situated in the municipality of Seia.

Climate
Torre is the culminating point of the Serra da Estrela range and as such tends to present the lowest temperatures and highest precipitation levels. The climate is defined as a transition between the typical Mediterranean climates seen south of the range and the not-so-typical oceanic climates found north of the range. Snow can occur anywhere between October and May, mostly in February, but can be irregular.

References

Sources 
  Serra da Estrela Forecast, Snow Report and Resort Information
  Região de Turismo da Serra da Estrela
  Câmara Municipal da Covilhã (Covilhã City Hall)

Serra da Estrela
One-thousanders of Portugal
Seia